Eupoecilia quinaspinalis is a species of moth of the family Tortricidae. It is found in China (Fujian, Hainan).

The wingspan is 11–13 mm. The ground colour of the forewings is yellowish, intermixed with dark brown. The basal half of the costa is suffused with dark brown. The hindwings are dark greyish.

Etymology
The species name refers to the aedeagus having five strong cornuti at the distal one-third and is derived from the Latin prefix quina- (meaning five) and spinalis (meaning having a spine).

References

Moths described in 2008
Eupoecilia